Jeunesse Sportive Centre Salif Keita (JS CSK) is a Malian football club based in Bamako.

History
Founded in 1995, former players include Mahamadou Diarra, Cheick Diabaté and Seydou Keita. The club was founded by Malian football legend Salif Keita as a training centre for young Malian football players.

Playing in the top division in Malian football its home stadium is Stade Centre Salif Keita. The team's colours are blue and yellow.

Performance in CAF competitions
CAF Confederation Cup: 1 appearance
2011 - Preliminary Round

CAF Cup: 1 appearance
1999 - First Round

Current squad

References

Football clubs in Mali
Association football clubs established in 1995
Sport in Bamako
1995 establishments in Mali